USS Polaris is a name used more than once by the United States Navy:

 , a converted Civil War screw steamer used on the Polaris expedition
 , built in 1939 as SS Donald McKay and acquired from the Maritime Commission on 27 January 1941

See also
 

United States Navy ship names